Hair is a 1979 American musical anti-war comedy-drama film based on the 1968 Broadway musical Hair: The American Tribal Love-Rock Musical. Set against the backdrop of the hippie counterculture of the Vietnam era, the film focuses on a Vietnam War draftee who meets and befriends a "tribe" of hippies while en route to the army induction center. The hippies and their leader introduce him to marijuana, LSD and their environment of unorthodox relationships and draft evasion.

The film was directed by Miloš Forman (who was nominated for a César Award for his work on the film) and adapted for the screen by Michael Weller (who would collaborate with Forman on a second picture, Ragtime, two years later). Cast members include John Savage, Treat Williams, Beverly D'Angelo, Annie Golden, Dorsey Wright, Don Dacus, Cheryl Barnes and Ronnie Dyson. Dance scenes were choreographed by Twyla Tharp and were performed by Tharp's dancers. The film was nominated for two Golden Globes: Best Motion Picture – Musical or Comedy, and New Star of the Year in a Motion Picture (for Williams).

Plot
Claude Hooper Bukowski of Oklahoma is sent off to New York City after being drafted into the Army ("Aquarius"). Before his draft board-appointment, Claude begins exploring New York, where he encounters a close-knit "tribe" of hippies led by George Berger. He observes the hippies panhandle from a trio of horseback riders including Short Hills, New Jersey debutante Sheila Franklin ("Sodomy") and later catches and mounts a runaway horse, which the hippies have rented, exhibiting his riding skills to Sheila ("Donna") before then returning the horse to Berger, who offers to show him around.

That evening, Claude gets stoned on marijuana with Berger and the tribe. He is then introduced to various race and class issues of the 1960s ("Hashish", "Colored Spade", "Manchester", "I'm Black/Ain't Got No"). The next morning, Berger finds a newspaper clipping which gives Sheila's address in Short Hills, New Jersey. The tribe members—LaFayette "Hud" Johnson, Jeannie Ryan (who is pregnant), and "Woof Dacshund"—crash a private dinner party to introduce Claude to Sheila, who secretly enjoys her rigid environment being disrupted ("I Got Life"). After Berger and company are arrested, Claude uses his last $50 to bail him out of jail—where Woof resists having his hair cut ("Hair").

When Sheila is unable to borrow any money from her father, Berger returns to his parents' home. His mother gives him enough cash to bail out his friends. They subsequently attend a peace rally in Central Park, where Claude drops acid for the first time ("Initials", "Electric Blues/Old Fashioned Melody", "Be In"). Just as Jeannie proposes marriage to Claude, in order to keep him out of the Army, Sheila shows up to apologize. Claude's "trip" reflects his inner conflict over which of three worlds he fits in with: his own native Oklahoman farm culture, Sheila's upper-class society, or the hippies' free-wheeling environment.

After his acid trip, Claude falls out with Berger and the tribe members, ostensibly due to a practical joke they pull on Sheila (taking her clothes while she's skinny-dipping, which forces her to hail a taxi in just her panties), but also due to their philosophical differences over the war in Vietnam—and over personal versus communal responsibility. After wandering the city ("Where Do I Go?"), Claude finally reports to the draft board (“Black Boys/White Boys”), completes his enlistment, and is shipped off to Nevada for basic training.

It's now Winter in New York when Claude writes to Sheila from Nevada ("Walking In Space"), who subsequently shares the news with the others. Berger devises a scheme to visit Claude in Nevada. Meanwhile, Hud's fiancée—with whom he has a son, LaFayette Jr.—wants to marry as they had apparently planned to earlier ("Easy To Be Hard"). The tribe members trick Sheila's brother Steve out of his car, then head west to visit Claude.

Arriving at the Army training center where Claude is stationed ("Three-Five-Zero-Zero", "Good Morning Starshine"), the hippies are turned away, ostensibly because the base is on alert, but also because the MP on duty loathes their appearance, proceeding to condescendingly caricaturize Berger's perceived vernacular. Sometime later, Sheila chats up army sergeant Fenton at a local bar, using sex to lure him to an isolated desert road and acquire his uniform. The hippies steal his car, and Berger cuts his hair and dons the uniform (symbolically becoming a responsible adult), then drives it onto the Army base. He finds Claude and offers to replace him for the next headcount so that Claude can meet Sheila and the others for a going-away picnic in the desert.

Unfortunately, just after a disguised Claude slips away to the picnic, the base becomes fully activated with immediate ship-outs for Vietnam. Berger's ruse is never discovered; clearly horrified of potentially joining the war, he is herded onto the plane to be shipped out. Claude returns to the empty barracks and frantically pursues Berger's plane but is unable to reach it before it takes off for Southeast Asia ("The Flesh Failures").

Months later, Claude, Sheila, and the tribe gather around Berger's grave in Arlington National Cemetery, whose grave marker shows that he was killed in Vietnam ("Let the Sunshine In").  The movie ends with what appears to be a full-scale peace-protest in Washington, D.C.

Cast

 John Savage as Claude Hooper Bukowski
 Treat Williams as George Berger
 Beverly D'Angelo as Sheila Franklin
 Annie Golden as Jeannie Ryan
 Dorsey Wright as LaFayette "Hud" Johnson
 Don Dacus as Woof Daschund
 Nell Carter as Central Park singer ("Ain't Got No" and "White Boys")
 Cheryl Barnes as Hud's fiancée
 Richard Bright as Sergeant Fenton
 Ellen Foley as Black Boys lead singer
 Miles Chapin as Steve, Sheila’s brother
 Charlotte Rae as Lady in Pink
 Laurie Beechman as Black Boys singer
 Nicholas Ray as the General
 Antonia Rey as Berger's Mother
 George J. Manos as Berger's Father
 Michael Jeter as Woodrow Sheldon
 Renn Woods as The Girl with Flowers (Singer of "Aquarius")
 David Rose as the Acid King (uncredited part)

Production 
The film was shot in October 1977. Filming locations included a number of well-known spots in New York City, including Central Park's Bethesda Fountain, Sheep Meadow, and the Central Park bandshell; and Washington Square Park. Scenes were also shot at the Fort Irwin National Training Center, in the Mojave Desert in northern San Bernardino County, California, and in Barstow, California; as well as in Washington, D.C., at the Lincoln Memorial, in the National Mall.

Soundtrack
The film omits the songs "The Bed", "Dead End", "Oh Great God of Power", "I Believe in Love", "Going Down", "Air", "My Conviction", "Abie Baby", "Frank Mills", and "What a Piece of Work is Man" from the musical. The latter five songs, even though recorded for the film, were eventually cut, as they slowed the film's pace. (These songs are included on the motion picture soundtrack album.)
A few verses from the songs "Manchester, England" and a small portion of "Walking in Space" have been removed
While the songs "Don't Put It Down" and "Somebody to Love" are not sung by characters in the film, they are both used as background or instrumental music for scenes at the army base. The latter was a new song written by MacDermot for the film. 
Several other differences from songs in the movie appear on the soundtrack, mainly in omitted verses and different orchestrations. One notable difference is that the Broadway version used only a jazz combo while the movie soundtrack use orchestrations that make ample use of full horn and string sections. Many of the songs have been shortened, sped-up, rearranged, or assigned to different characters to allow for the differences in plot.

Ronny Dyson and Melba Moore, who were in the Broadway version of Hair, both sing on the song "Three Five Zero Zero."

Charts

Reception
Hair grossed $15.3 million in the United States and Canada. By the end of 1979 it had grossed $38,290,492 worldwide.

The film received generally favorable reviews from film critics at the time of its release; it currently holds an 82% "fresh" rating on review aggregate website Rotten Tomatoes from 60 reviews. The critical consensus reads, "Spiritedly performed by a groovy cast and imaginatively directed by Milos Forman, Hair transports audiences straight to the Age of Aquarius."

Writing in The New York Times, Vincent Canby called it "a rollicking musical memoir.... [Michael] Weller's inventions make this Hair seem much funnier than I remember the show's having been. They also provide time and space for the development of characters who, on the stage, had to express themselves almost entirely in song.... The entire cast is superb.... Mostly... the film is a delight." Frank Rich said: "If ever a project looked doomed, it was this one" (referring to the "largely plotless" and dated musical upon which it was based, Forman's and Tharp's lack of movie musical experience, the "largely unproven cast" and the film's "grand budget"); but that in spite of these obstacles, "Hair succeeds at all levels—as lowdown fun, as affecting drama, as exhilarating spectacle and as provocative social observation. It achieves its goals by rigorously obeying the rules of classic American musical comedy: dialogue, plot, song and dance blend seamlessly to create a juggernaut of excitement. Though every cut and camera angle in Hair appears to have been carefully conceived, the total effect is spontaneous. Like the best movie musicals of the '50s (Singin' in the Rain) and the '60s (A Hard Day's Night), Hair leaps from one number to the next. Soon the audience is leaping too."

Gene Siskel and Roger Ebert both placed Hair on their list of Top Films of 1979.  Siskel named it as the best film of the year, #1 on his list.

Awards and honors
The film was shown out of competition at the 1979 Cannes Film Festival.

At the 37th Golden Globe Awards, the film was nominated for a Best Motion Picture – Musical or Comedy, and Williams was nominated for New Star of the Year in a Motion Picture – Male.  The film was also nominated for Best Foreign Film at the 1980 César Awards, losing to Woody Allen's Manhattan (which was also released by United Artists).

Years later, Forman cited his loss of his moral rights to the film to the studio as eventually leading to his 1997 John Huston Award for Artists Rights from the Film Foundation:
What was behind that [award] was that one day I had in my contract that when the studio wants to sell Hair ...to the network but they have to have my, you know, consent or how would they...what they do with it. But I didn't have this, so what they did, they didn't sell it to the network, they sold it to syndicated television where I didn't have that right.  What happened:  the film played on 115 syndicated stations practically all over the United States, and it's a musical. Out of 22 musical numbers, 11 musical numbers were cut out from the film, and yet it was still presented as a Milos Forman film, Hair. It was totally incomprehensible, jibberish, butchered beyond belief...

The New York Times placed the film on its Best 1000 Movies Ever list.

The film is recognized by American Film Institute in these lists:
 2004: AFI's 100 Years...100 Songs:
 "Aquarius" – #33
 2006: AFI's Greatest Movie Musicals – Nominated

Home media
Hair was released on VHS by 20th Century Fox Video in 1982 with later VHS releases from MGM/UA Home Video.  The film was released on DVD by MGM Home Entertainment on April 27, 1999, as a Region 1 widescreen DVD, and on Blu-Ray on June 7, 2011.

Theatrical differences
As the film's plot and soundtrack differ greatly from the original musical, Gerome Ragni and James Rado, who wrote the stage show with composer Galt MacDermot, were unhappy with the film adaptation. They felt it failed to capture the essence of Hair in that hippies were portrayed as "oddballs" and "some sort of aberration" without any connection to the peace movement.  Ragni and Rado stated, "Any resemblance between the 1979 film and the original Biltmore version, other than some of the songs, the names of the characters, and a common title, eludes us." In their view, the screen version of Hair had not yet been produced.

In the musical, Claude is a member of a hippie "tribe" sharing a New York City apartment, leading a bohemian lifestyle, enjoying "free love", and rebelling against his parents and the draft, but he eventually goes to Vietnam. In the film, Claude is rewritten as an innocent draftee from Oklahoma, newly arrived in New York City to join the military. In New York, he gets caught up with the group of hippies while awaiting deployment to Army training camp. They introduce Claude to their psychedelically inspired style of living and eventually the tribe drive to Nevada to visit him at training camp.
In the musical, Sheila is an outspoken feminist leader of the Tribe who loves Berger as well as Claude. In the film, she is a high-society debutante who catches Claude's eye.
In the film, Berger is not only at the heart of the hippie Tribe but is assigned some of Claude's conflict involving whether or not to obey the draft.  A major plot change in the film involves a mistake that leads Berger to go to Vietnam in Claude's place, where he is killed.
The musical focuses on the U.S. peace movement, as well as the love relationships among the Tribe members, while the film focuses on the carefree antics of the hippies.

References

External links 

 
 
 
 
 
 
 Trailer  from trailerfan.com

1979 films
1979 comedy-drama films
1970s musical comedy-drama films
1970s war comedy-drama films
American musical comedy-drama films
American rock musicals
American war comedy-drama films
Anti-war comedy films
Anti-war films about the Vietnam War
1970s English-language films
Films based on musicals
Films directed by Miloš Forman
Films set in the 1960s
Films set in New York City
Films set in Oklahoma
Films shot in California
Films shot in New York City
Hippie films
United Artists films
1970s American films